Pingshi Town is a town of Lechang City, in the far north of Guangdong Province, China, near the border with Hunan.

Pingshi was called Pingshi County (literally "flat rock county") during the Southern and Northern Dynasties (420589). Nowadays it is the "northern door of Guangdong", serving as a prominent border trade and transit point for the provinces of Guangdong, Hunan and Jiangxi.

Pingshi lies at the intersection of the Beijing–Guangzhou Railway and the Wuhan–Guangzhou High-Speed Railway. Major roads passing through the town include the G4 Beijing–Hong Kong and Macau Expressway, China National Highway 107, and Guangdong Provincial Highways 248 and 249. City bridges include Pingshi Bridge, Futian Bridge, Pingmei Bridge, and Baisha Bridge.

Pingshi's GDP is 1.6 billion yuan. Pingshi B power plant powers the majority of northern Shaoguan. Major industries of Pingshi include Chinese medicine and zirconium products. There are over 2000 private and individual enterprises and a state-run prison.

The Pingshi region is rich in tourism resources. It is home to one of the eight wonders of Guangdong: "Jinji Ling" (literally "Golden Chicken Mountain").

References

External links 

Shaoguan
Township-level divisions of Guangdong